Faraba Banta  is a small town in south-western Gambia. It is located in Kombo East District in the Western Division.  As of 2009, it has an estimated population of 3, 626. The town was the site of the Faraba shooting on 18 June 2018.

References

Populated places in the Gambia
Kombo East